Rublenița is a commune in Soroca District, Moldova. It is composed of two villages, Rublenița and Rublenița Nouă.

References

Communes of Soroca District